Tricolia insignis is a species of small sea snail with calcareous opercula, a marine gastropod mollusk in the family Phasianellidae, the pheasant snails.

Description
The shell reaches a height of 3.5 mm.

Distribution
This marine species occurs off southeast South Africa.

References

External links
 To World Register of Marine Species
 

Phasianellidae
Gastropods described in 1932